Census Division No. 16 is a census division located within the Parklands Region of the province of Manitoba, Canada. Unlike in some other provinces, census divisions do not reflect the organization of local government in Manitoba. These areas exist solely for the purposes of statistical analysis and presentation; they have no government of their own.

The economy of the area is agriculture and livestock. The population of the region as of the 2006 census was 9,945. Also included in the division are the main reserves of the Gamblers First Nation, the Tootinaowaziibeeng First Nation (Valley River), and the Waywayseecappo First Nation.

Demographics 

Unincorporated communities

 Binscarth
 Roblin
 Rossburn
 Russell

Municipalities 
Roblin
Riding Mountain West
Rossburn
Russell – Binscarth

Reserves
 Gambler 63 (part)
 Valley River 63A
 Waywayseecappo First Nation

References

External links
 Manitoba Community Profiles: Roblin, Russell, Rossburn Area 

16